The Parvati Barrage, also known as the Sundilla Barrage is an irrigation project located at Kasipeta Village, Manthani Mandal, Peddapalli district in Telangana State, India.

This is one of the three barrages proposed in Kaleshwaram Project which envisages construction of three barrages between Yellampalli (Ramagundam) and Medigadda.

Proposed Sundilla Barrage details:
 

Nearby areas  are Godavarikhani(15km),Manthani(15km)Sundilla(15km). is surrounded by Jaipur Mandal towards the north, Ramagundam(Godavarikhani) Mandal towards the west, Manthani Mandal towards the south, and Mancherial Mandal towards the north.

Ramagundam, Godavari khani, Mancherial, Peddapalli, Manthani, Jaipur are nearby cities and towns. It is on the border of the Peddapalle District and Mancherial District. Mancherial District Jaipur is North towards this place. This project is equidistant from Godavarikhani and Manthani bus stations. The nearest railway station is Ramagundam. The nearest airport is Ramagundam (Basant Nagar). 

Sundilla Barrage is named after Sundilla Village, which is a small village with nearly 1200 population in Ramagiri mandal of Peddapalli district.

Project info
Sundilla Barrage foundation was laid by First Chief Minister of Telangana, K.Chandrashekar Rao on 2 May 2016.

See also
 Medigadda Barrage
 Annaram Barrage
 Lower Manair Dam
 Mid Manair Dam
 Kaddam Project
 Upper Manair Dam
 SRSP Flood Flow Canal
 Pranahita Chevella
 Alisagar lift irrigation scheme
 Sri Komaram Bheem Project
 Icchampally Project

References

Dams on the Godavari River
Dams in Telangana
Irrigation in Telangana
Adilabad district
Karimnagar district
Godavari basin